Vikash Vishal (born 6 February 1999) is an Indian cricketer. He made his Twenty20 debut on 16 January 2021, for Jharkhand in the 2020–21 Syed Mushtaq Ali Trophy. He made his first-class debut on 24 February 2022, for Jharkhand in the 2021–22 Ranji Trophy.

References

External links
 

1999 births
Living people
Indian cricketers
Jharkhand cricketers
Place of birth missing (living people)